Armak or Ormak may refer to:
 Armak, East Azerbaijan
 Armak, Hormozgan
 Ormak, Isfahan
 Armak, Mazandaran